Connor Tracey (born 17 June 1996) is an Australian professional rugby league footballer who plays as a  or  for the Cronulla-Sutherland Sharks in the NRL.

He previously played for the South Sydney Rabbitohs in the National Rugby League.

Background
Tracey was born in Sydney, New South Wales, Australia.

Career

2018
Tracey is a local Cronulla-Sutherland junior from the De La Salle Caringbah club. Tracey then signed with South Sydney in 2015 and initially played in the club's Under 20's team.  In 2018, Tracey played for South Sydney's feeder club side North Sydney in the Intrust Super Premiership NSW.  At the end of the year, Tracey was named as North Sydney's best back.  Tracey started the 2019 season for Souths in the Canterbury Cup NSW.

2019
Tracey made his first grade debut in round 12 of the 2019 NRL season for South Sydney in their 26-14 loss to the Parramatta Eels.

On 4 August 2019, it was revealed that Tracey would be departing Souths at the end of the 2019 NRL season after signing with Cronulla-Sutherland for the 2020 season.

On 29 September 2019, Tracey was named in the 2019 Canterbury Cup NSW team of the season.

2020
In round 1 of the 2020 NRL season, he made his debut for Cronulla-Sutherland against South Sydney.  In the final minutes of the game, Tracey set up what would have been the match winning try but his pass was deemed to have gone forward.  In round 12, he scored his first try in the top grade as Cronulla defeated Brisbane 36-26 at Suncorp Stadium.

2021
In round 4 of the 2021 NRL season, he scored two tries for Cronulla in a 48-10 victory over North Queensland at Kogarah Oval. Following a number of injuries to Cronulla’s usual lineup, Tracey was utilised at both the centre and wing positions, equaling his four-try total from the previous season in his first eight appearances of 2021.

In round 16 of the 2021 NRL season, Tracey scored two tries in a shock 26-18 defeat against Brisbane.
Tracey played 24 games for Cronulla and scored 14 tries in the 2021 NRL season which saw the club narrowly miss the finals by finishing 9th on the table.

2022
In the 2022 NRL season, Cronulla finished second on the table.  In the first week of the finals, Cronulla lead North Queensland 30-22 with eight minutes to go until Tracey was sin binned for a professional foul on Valentine Holmes.  North Queensland would go on to win the match 32-30 in extra-time.
Tracey was retained in the Cronulla squad for the following weeks match against South Sydney.  Tracey played at centre in Cronulla's 38-12 loss which ended their season.

Statistics

NRL
 Statistics are correct as of the end of the 2022 season

References

External links
Cronulla Sharks profile
South Sydney Rabbitohs profile

1996 births
Living people
Australian rugby league players
Cronulla-Sutherland Sharks players
South Sydney Rabbitohs players
North Sydney Bears NSW Cup players
Rugby league halfbacks
Rugby league five-eighths
Rugby league players from Sydney